Archduke Leopold Johann of Austria (13 April 1716 – 4 November 1716), was the last-born male descendant from the House of Habsburg. The only son and long-hoped heir of Charles VI, Holy Roman Emperor, with his and his father's death in 1740, the Habsburg male line died out completely, being succeeded by the House of Habsburg-Lorraine (originated by the marriage of Leopold Johann's sister Maria Theresa and Francis III Stephen, Duke of Lorraine) who ruled the Habsburg domains until their dethronement following World War I in 1918.

Birth and baptism
Charles VI, Holy Roman Emperor and his wife Elisabeth Christine of Brunswick-Wolfenbüttel had been married for seven years when the Empress' first pregnancy was confirmed. Since the beginning, Elisabeth Christine was under the immense pressure to produce a male heir: she had to endure numerous treatments to cure her inability to have children. Among other things, she undertook pilgrimages to Mariazell, cures in Karlsbad, a wine cure (court doctors prescribed large doses of liquor to make her more fertile, which gave her face a permanent blush) and visit to clairvoyants and astrologers. The imperial bedchamber has been even painted with stimulating erotic scenes on the walls and ceiling to make her expected a baby male by stimulating her fantasy.

The birth of Leopold Johann on 13 April 1716 at 7:30 p.m. was celebrated with great pomp in the style of the Spanish court ceremonial. At that time Austria, along with the Republic of Venice, was at war against the Turks. As the heir to the throne of the Habsburg dynasty, he received the Order of the Golden Fleece at birth, since his father himself was Grand Master of the Order in Austria. The solemn baptism took place the next day in the Knights' Hall (Rittersaal) of the Hofburg and with water of the Jordan River from the Holy Land. The infant's full name Leopold Johann Anton Joseph Franz de Paula Hermengild Rudolph Ignatius Balthasar refer to the Habsburg family tradition and the veneration of saints of the time. The ceremony was performed by the Papal Nuncio together with the Cathedral Provost of St. Stephen's Cathedral and the Abbot of the Schottenstift. Also present were the Archbishop of Prague, Franz Ferdinand von Kuenburg, and the Archbishop of Valencia, Antonio Folc de Cardona, as well as eight other bishops and nine abbots. The godfather was King John V of Portugal, who was married to Maria Anna of Austria, paternal aunt of Leopold Johann. The Portuguese monarch was represented by the Imperial Field Marshal and Prince Maximilian William of Brunswick-Lüneburg.

On the occasion of the birth, Charles VI commissioned a valuable medal. The translation of the Latin transcription reads:

A medal was also made by Elisabeth Christine, which was created by Georg Wilhelm Vestner created. The important Austrian baroque composer Johann Joseph Fux wrote the opera Angelica vincitrice di Alcina to celebrate the birth, which was first performed on 14 September 1716. The set was designed by the stage designer Giuseppe Galli da Bibiena, who had placed the stage on two islands in a pond in the Favorita park. In addition to the imperial couple, the court and numerous ambassadors attended the premiere. Georg Philipp Telemann also composed homage music for the birth of Leopold Johann, which was first performed at Frankfurt in 1716.

In June 1716 Reinhard Keiser staged the musical comedy and dance play Das Römische April-Fest (The Roman April Festival) on the occasion of the birth of the heir to the throne. Barthold Feind wrote the libretto. In addition, numerous printed works on the territory of the Holy Roman Empire as homage to the Archduke appeared.

Death and burial
The ailing Leopold Johann died in Vienna on 4 November 1716 aged seven months. The hope that the child would remain healthy, since there was no close relationship between his mother Elisabeth Christine and the imperial family, which was not a matter of course according to the marriage policy of the House of Habsburg (Pedigree collapse), was not fulfilled. Charles VI was deeply affected by the death of his son, as evidenced by the lack of entries in his diaries from the death of Leopold Johann until the end of 1716.

The burial was based from the 1668 burial ceremony of Archduke Ferdinand Wenzel (28 September 1667 – 13 January 1668), the first-born son of Leopold I, Holy Roman Emperor. On the morning of 5 November 1716, the body was buried in the presence of the Oberhofmeister Anton Florian, Prince of Liechtenstein, the Lady-in-waiting Sabine Christina, Countess of Starhemberg, three imperial physicians and the body surgeon Heinrich Cöster, who opened the corpse for conservation. The internal organs and the heart were removed and the corpse was embalmed. The child's body was then placed on a catafalque in the Antecamera, the Virtue Hall (Tugendsaal) of the Hofburg, and blessed by the court and Imperial Court and Castle priest (K.u.k. Hof- und Burgpfarre). He wore a crown of flowers and around his neck the small chain of the Order of the Golden Fleece. The large fleece necklace and the Archducal hat lay on a silver cushion.

The silver urn with the removed heart and the copper urn with the entrails were taken to St. Stephen's Cathedral in Vienna on the same day and placed in the Ducal Crypt. In the evening at 11:00 p.m. the body was consecrated again and led with a large entourage to the Capuchin Church. The coffin was blessed for the last time and opened in the presence of the Oberhofmeister and the Oberkammerer to show the body. Six capuchin priests then brought the coffin into the Imperial Crypt.

Today's sarcophagus of Leopold Johann in the Imperial Crypt was built in 1740 according to the instructions of Charles VI. Made as an overcoffin for the original coffin. It should be reminiscent of ancient models. A folds of ermine mantle lies over the ornamented lid and on top of it, on a cushion, is the Archducal hat. The coffin was made of tin. The long sides are decorated with angels' heads with spread wings, the coffin itself rests on four bear paws. It was probably created by the Salzburg tin master Hans Georg Lehrl. At the base under a crucifix is ​​a rolled up tablet. The inscription, written in Latin, reads in translation:

After the death of their son, the imperial couple donated, as a sign of their piety, a baby Jesus in silver to the Mother of God of Mariazell at the place of grace, which corresponded to the weight of the deceased child.

Notes

References

Bibliography

 Bey Der Höchsterwünschtesten Gebuhrt Des Durchlauchtigsten Kayser- und Königl. Printzen Leopoldi, Josephi, Josephi, Johannis, Antonii, Francisci De Paula, Hermenegildi, Rudolphi, Ignatii, Balthasaris, Ertz-Hertzogs von Oesterreich. (in German). Breslau 1716.

External links
 
 Entry on Leopold Johann of Austria in Kalliope-Verbund
 Entry about Leopold of Austria im Index der Deutsche Biographie
 Entry on Leopold Johann (Austria, Archduke) (1716–1716) in CERL Thesaurus
 Entry about Leopold, Archduke of Austria in Digitaler Portraitindex
 Entry about Austria, Archduke Leopold of in Gesamtkatalog deutschsprachiger Leichenpredigten

1716 births
1716 deaths
18th-century archdukes of Austria
Nobility from Vienna
Burials at the Imperial Crypt
Burials at St. Stephen's Cathedral, Vienna
Knights of the Golden Fleece
Sons of emperors
Royalty and nobility who died as children
Sons of kings